The Great Western Railway  is a Canadian short line railway company operating on former Canadian Pacific Railway trackage in Southwest Saskatchewan. Great Western Railway Ltd. is an operating company that services the line and is locally owned and operated by farmers and municipalities in Southwestern Saskatchewan.

History

Abbotsford based Westcan Ltd., a railway contracting and maintenance company from BC, purchased 330 miles of track from CP and announced the launch of a new Westcan-owned short line, Great Western Railway Ltd, to provide service on these lines.  The original purchase date was July 31, 2000, but this date was pushed to September 8, 2000 after overwhelming rainfall washed out 16 km of track on the Vanguard Subdivision, one of the branches that was being sold.  An agreement was reached with Canadian Pacific to repair the damaged section at a cost of more than 500,000 before the takeover was completed.

In 2004 the railway was purchased by local investors from the area of Saskatchewan it serves. It is now locally owned and operated. Great Western Railway continues to serve many producer loading sites along their entire rail network, but also provide railcar storage for Class I railways and railcar companies.

GWR also services  on the Fife Lake Railway, which is partially owned by the company, and another  of the Red Coat Road & Rail on a yearly contractual basis.

Engine Roster

Great Western Railway had humble beginnings hauling hopper cars of grain for small producer loading sites, but as Great Western Railway gradually gained trackage rights over Red Coat Road & Rail and Fife Lake Railway, the railway required more motive power to provide sufficient customer service for their new customers. Up until 2011, Great Western Railway utilized an all MLW M420 roster; however, with the increased maintenance cost of operating Montreal Locomotive Works locomotives, Great Western Railway decided to purchase their first General Electric units. In March 2011 it was announced Great Western Railway would receive two former Burlington Northern Santa Fe GE B40-8Ws for the original Great Western route.
In early 2017, GWRS 576 was purchased, continuing the company's effort to move into an entire G.E. fleet. Great Western Rail is currently in the process of selling their entire MLW fleet.

See also

 List of Canadian railways
 Rail transport in Canada

References

External links

Great Western Railway Official Website
Saskatchewan Rail Network 2015

Saskatchewan railways
Standard gauge railways in Canada